Mao Zijun (born 31 December 1986) is a Chinese actor.

Career
Mao debuted in the 2009 television series Niang Qi and thereafter gained attention for his role as the 14th prince in the 2011 hit drama Palace. The same year, he won the "Best Supporting Actor" award at the Youku Television Awards for his performance in The Glamorous Imperial Concubine. Mao later gained more attention through his antagonist role in the fantasy action drama hit, Noble Aspirations. He gained further recognition with his supporting roles in The Glory of Tang Dynasty and The Destiny of White Snake.

Mao starred in his first lead role in the 2019 historical drama The Legend of Haolan, playing the Qin Emperor.

Filmography

Film

Television series

Television show

Awards and nominations

References

Chinese male television actors
Chinese male film actors
21st-century Chinese male actors
1986 births
Living people
Male actors from Zhejiang